Camden is a city in and the county seat of Wilcox County, Alabama, United States.  The population was 2,020 at the 2010 census, down from 2,257 in 2000, at which time it was a town.

History
What is now Camden was established on property donated by Thomas Dunn from his plantation holdings in order to have a new town founded on the site in 1833 to serve as the county seat.  Dunn's Federal style house, built in 1825, is the oldest documented house in the town.  The first county seat was in the community of Canton Bend.

The county seat was moved in 1833 to Barboursville, later renamed Camden.  It had been named Barboursville in honor of United States Congressman Philip P. Barbour of Virginia. Incorporated in 1841, Camden was renamed by local physician John D. Caldwell in honor of his hometown of Camden, South Carolina. 

The area depended on cultivation of cotton as a commodity crop, which was worked by numerous African-American slaves. The earliest documented industries in the town were a brickyard, sawmill, and window fabricator.  The Camden Phenix was the town's earliest known newspaper. Townspeople founded a girls' school in 1844, the Wilcox Female Seminary and Female Institute, whose red-brick Greek-Revival style building was constructed from 1845 to 1850.  In 1976 the former school was adapted to house the Wilcox County Historical Society.

The red-brick Greek-Revival style Wilcox County Courthouse, also listed on the National Register of Historic Places, was completed in 1857.  It replaced an earlier wood-frame structure.

During the American Civil War, many in the community joined the Confederate cause. The county courthouse was ransacked by Union forces in 1865, but advance warning allowed county officials to remove the county records to a safe place (legend claims that they were buried in a coffin) prior to arrival of Union troops. Already devastated by the Civil War, Camden suffered fires during 1869 and 1870 that destroyed about two-thirds of the town. The town began to recover during the 1880s, with the first bank incorporated in 1894.

Camden benefited economically during the mid-20th century with the construction of a paper mill at Yellow Bluff and of the Millers Ferry Lock and Dam, a hydroelectric dam on the Alabama River near Millers Ferry. This created the William "Bill" Dannelly Reservoir, which has served as an important recreational resource.

Geography

Climate
According to the Köppen climate classification, Camden has a humid subtropical climate (abbreviated Cfa).

Demographics

2000 census
At the 2000 census there were 2,257 people, 868 households, and 584 families living in the town. The racial makeup of the town was 54.23% African American, 45.28% White, 0.09% Native American, 0.09% from other races, and 0.31% from two or more races. 0.53% of the population were Hispanic or Latino of any race.
Of the 868 households 35.9% had children under the age of 18 living with them, 37.6% were married couples living together, 27.0% had a female householder with no husband present, and 32.7% were non-families. 31.0% of households were one person and 16.0% were one person aged 65 or older. The average household size was 2.45 and the average family size was 3.09.

The age distribution was 29.1% under the age of 18, 8.6% from 18 to 24, 24.2% from 25 to 44, 19.8% from 45 to 64, and 18.3% 65 or older. The median age was 36 years. For every 100 females, there were 78.3 males. For every 100 females age 18 and over, there were 71.2 males.

The median household income was $25,750 and the median family income  was $28,854. Males had a median income of $35,625 versus $20,735 for females. The per capita income for the town was $14,272. About 31.4% of families and 33.6% of the population were below the poverty line, including 43.3% of those under age 18 and 29.6% of those age 65 or over.

2010 census
At the 2010 census there were 2,020 people, 790 households, and 540 families living in the town. The racial makeup of the town was 57.4% African American, 42.0% White, 0.1% Native American, 0.1% from other races, and 0.4% from two or more races. 0.7% of the population were Hispanic or Latino of any race.
Of the 790 households 31.0% had children under the age of 18 living with them, 36.1% were married couples living together, 26.3% had a female householder with no husband present, and 31.6% were non-families. 29.9% of households were one person and 14.4% were one person aged 65 or older. The average household size was 2.47 and the average family size was 3.07.

The age distribution was 28.6% under the age of 18, 7.1% from 18 to 24, 21.0% from 25 to 44, 25.9% from 45 to 64, and 17.4% 65 or older. The median age was 37.7 years. For every 100 females, there were 78.6 males. For every 100 females age 18 and over, there were 80.3 males.

The median household income was $21,563 and the median family income  was $37,031. Males had a median income of $60,250 versus $23,380 for females. The per capita income for the town was $15,978. About 27.0% of families and 31.6% of the population were below the poverty line, including 42.6% of those under age 18 and 15.6% of those age 65 or over.

2020 census

As of the 2020 United States census, there were 1,927 people, 664 households, and 501 families residing in the city.

Education
 Wilcox Academy, a private K-12 academy
 Wilcox Central High School, a public high school

Notable people 
 Henry Aaron - right fielder, born in Camden, raised in Mobile.
 Johnny Baker - former American Football League linebacker and tight end.
 Jo Bonner - former U.S. Representative who was reared in Camden.
 Elizabeth Brown – contemporary composer and performer
 Hank Harris - former guard for the Washington Redskins.
 Kay Ivey - Current Governor of Alabama, former Alabama State Treasurer
 Tom Jenkins - reserve outfielder.
 Elliott Jones - first head football coach for of Vanderbilt University.
 Annie L. Key - former member of the Ohio Representative.
 Ronnie McNeir - singer-songwriter.
 James A. Merriman - physician and newspaper editor
 Benjamin Meek Miller - Alabama Governor.
 Jimmy Newberry - pitcher in the Negro leagues and the Pacific League.
 Adrian Pledger (born 1976) - basketball player
 J. De Forest Richards - former American football player and banker.
 Jeff Sessions - U.S. Attorney General, Alabama Attorney General, U.S. Senator (school).
 Palmer Williams Jr., actor.

Transportation
Intercity bus service is provided by Greyhound Lines.

References

Cities in Alabama
Cities in Wilcox County, Alabama
County seats in Alabama